The 2017 Asian Indoor and Martial Arts Games, which is also counted as the 5th Asian Indoor Games, was held in Ashgabat, Turkmenistan in 2017. It became the third city in the former Soviet countries to win the right of hosting an Olympic Council of Asia-sanctioned event, following Astana and Almaty in Kazakhstan, which jointly-hosted the 2011 Asian Winter Games. The host city was chosen in Kuwait on 19 December 2010. On 6 July 2013 the flag of the Olympic Council of Asia was officially handed over to the mayor of the city of Ashgabat.

Development and preparation

Venues 
The Asian Indoor and Martial Arts Games were held at the Ashgabat Olympic Complex, which is a unique facility which has no parallel in the Central Asian region. The Complex boasts of over 30 structures, which also includes 15 competition venues, an Athletes' Village and a Paralympic Rehabilitation Medical Center. The construction was launched by the President of Turkmenistan Gurbanguly Berdimuhamedow. On November 5, 2010, the Turkmen President took part in the official stone laying ceremony for the Olympic Village. Investment in the first phase amounted to nearly $2 billion. The second phase of construction cost $3 billion. The total cost of the Olympic Village was $5 billion and the construction was carried by Turkish construction company Polimeks.

For the convenience of athletes and spectators, the Olympic village have all the necessary infrastructure including social, cultural and shopping centers, hotels, restaurants, cafes, shops, consumer services and car park. The campus are laid with new pedestrian crossings and a monorail.

Several national higher educational institutions are located right next to the Olympic village. The Turkmen State Institute of Economics and Management, the Institute of Culture, the State Border Service Academy of Turkmenistan, and the National Institute of Sports and Tourism all have their campuses nearby. These universities will use the brand-new sports facilities built for the Games in the future.

Test events
The Senior Asian Weightlifting Championship, the WAKO Asian Kickboxing Championships, and the Central Asian Short Course Swimming Championships took place concurrently as part of the Inspiring Ashgabat Test Event Series.

Weightlifting

The Senior Asian Weightlifting Championships competition began 23 April and ended on 29 April at the Weightlifting Arena. Athletes competed for 144 medals which were awarded for snatch, clean & jerk and total in each bodyweight category. Asia has a strong pedigree in weightlifting with 31 of the 45 medals at the Rio 2016 Olympics being awarded to Asian countries.

Kickboxing
The Martial Arts Arena hosted the Asian Kickboxing Championships between 26–30 April with athletes from up to 20 countries competing over the course of five days. The competition included 27 categories for men and 10 for women which were featured in the Ring and 28 categories for men and 16 for women on the Tatami. The event saw up to 354 medals awarded.

Short course swimming
In addition to these international competitions the Aquatics Federation of Turkmenistan have organised the first ever Central Asian Short Course Swimming Tournament which consisted of an invitational short course (25) competition in the new Indoor Aquatics Centre. Athletes from neighbouring countries Kazakhstan, Kyrgyzstan, Uzbekistan, Tajikistan, Iran and Afghanistan will be competed across a number of individual and relay events on 26–27 April 2017.

Events

Opening ceremony

The opening ceremony of the games took place on Sunday, 17 September 2017 at the newly built Olympic Stadium in Ashgabat.

Closing ceremony
The closing ceremony of the games took place on 27 September at the Olympic Stadium. There were live performances from international singers such Russian Nyusha, Lebanese Elissa, English John Newman and many other local musical performers.

Participating National Olympic Committees 
All 45 member countries of the Olympic Council of Asia were invited to compete at these Games. For the first time in the Asian Games are attended by 17 Oceania National Olympic Committees. Oceania countries will be under full participation, so they will be eligible for medals.

Sports
A total of 21 sports are represented for the Indoor and Martial Arts Games: seven Olympic sports (3-on-3 basketball, cycling, taekwondo, tennis, weightlifting and wrestling), four Olympic sports contested only in non-Olympic formats (athletics, equestrian, football, swimming) and eleven non-Olympic sports (bowling, chess, cue sports, dancesport, ju-jitsu, kickboxing, kurash, muaythai, sambo, belt wrestling and traditional wrestling)

Numbers in parentheses indicate the number of medal events contested in each sports discipline.

Demonstration sports

Calendar
In the following calendar for the 2017 Asian Indoor and Martial Arts Games, each blue box represents an event competition, such as a qualification round, on that day. The yellow boxes represent days during which medal-awarding finals for a sport were held, which numeric representing the number of finals that were contested on that day. On the left the calendar lists each sport with events held during the Games, and at the right how many gold medals were won in that sport. There is a key at the top of the calendar to aid the reader.

Medal table

Doping
What follows is a list of all the athletes that have tested positive for a banned substance during the Games. Any medals listed were revoked.

Marketing, branding and design

Brand look 
Brand look and all design related works of the Games made by Belli Creative Studio

Emblem
The emblem of the 2017 Asian Indoor and Martial Arts Games is the image of Akhal-teke, the national horse of Turkmenistan which is renowned for
its speed, endurance and intelligence that represents Health. Surrounding the horse were the green Moon that represents Inspiration and the sun, the symbol of the Olympic Council of Asia, which represents friendship.

Mascot
The 2017 Asian Indoor and Martial Arts Games Mascot is a Central Asian Shepherd Dog named Wepaly – meaning loyal friend in Turkmen. Locally known as Alabai, the Central Asian Shepherd Dog is renowned as a courageous animal in Turkmenistan for many centuries has helped Turkmen shepherds to safeguard flocks of cattle in heavy conditions in the sandy desert. Wepaly wears traditional ceremonial dress and a white telpek fur hat while waving the State Flag of Turkmenistan and the symbol of the Olympic Council of Asia. The mascot was unveiled 200 days before the games and was originally coloured green, but Turkmenistan's president Gurbanguly Berdimuhamedow ordered a last minute makeover possibly due to poor public reception.

Medals
The medals of the 2017 Asian Indoor and Martial Arts Games were revealed on February 16, 2017 and were designed by Singaporean company Eng Leong Medallic Industries. The medals shaped like eight pointed Oguz Khan Stars, the national emblem of the host nation and featured elements like olive branches and the five traditional carpet motifs on its obverse and the games' emblem on its reverse. The olive branches symbolising peace, the country's neutrality status and its commitment to peaceful development of international relations, while the five traditional carpet motifs represent the provinces of the country and the traditionally warm Turkmen hospitality. A total of 2,000 medals were produced for the Games, weighing 721 kilograms all-together.

Sponsors

See also
2017 Asian Winter Games

References

External links

 
2017
2017 in multi-sport events
2017 in Asian sport
2017 in Turkmenistani sport
International sports competitions hosted by Turkmenistan
Multi-sport events in Turkmenistan
September 2017 sports events in Asia
21st century in Ashgabat